Yevgeni Nikolayevich Puzin (born 20 March 1990) is a Russian football goalkeeper.

Club career
He made his Russian Football National League debut for FC Sibir Novosibirsk on 13 October 2013 in a game against FC Salyut Belgorod.

References

External links
 Career summary by sportbox.ru
 

1990 births
Sportspeople from Krasnodar
Living people
Russian footballers
Association football goalkeepers
FC Dynamo Moscow reserves players
FC Fakel Voronezh players
FC Sibir Novosibirsk players
FC Chernomorets Novorossiysk players
FC Khimki players
FC Torpedo Moscow players
FC Kuban Krasnodar players
FC Sportakademklub Moscow players